George E. Brennan (d. August 8, 1928) was a Democratic Party political boss in Illinois.

Biography
Brennan was born in Ireland and he lost his right leg when he was 13. He had substituted for a switchman who was off on a post-payday drunk, at a coal mine in Braidwood, Illinois. He tried to uncouple two cars from a moving train and his right foot became wedged in a railroad switch. He was "plump and nimble-witted, a poker player and duck hunter, a successful and honest businessman, a philanthropist who gave away several hundred wooden legs." In 1923 he supported William Emmett Dever as Mayor of Chicago.

Deneen was a member of the Democratic National Committee.

In 1926, Brennan "bet his bossdom against a seat in the U. S. Senate that Illinois is sick of Prohibition" and lost to Frank L. Smith.

References

Year of birth missing
1928 deaths
American political bosses from Illinois
Illinois Democrats
Irish amputees
American amputees
Irish emigrants to the United States (before 1923)
People from Braidwood, Illinois
Democratic National Committee people